Scottish queen, Queen of Scots, Queen of Scotland, is a royal title that became extinct in 1707 with the Acts of Union between England and Scotland forming the United Kingdom of Great Britain. It frequently refers to the Queen of the United Kingdom since 1707. 

Queen of Scotland, Queen of Scots, or Scottish Queen, may also refer to:

Royalty
 Queen Elizabeth II (1926-2022, r. 1952-2022), the former queen of the United Kingdom of Great Britain, which includes Scotland
 A female Scottish monarch
 Mary, Queen of Scots (1542-1587, r. 1542-1567), the last monarch to be Queen of Scots independently of Queen of England
 Anne, Queen of Great Britain (1665-1714, r. 1707-1714), who was also Queen of England (r. 1702-1707) and Queen of Scotland (r. 1702-1707), the last monarch before the Union of Scotland and England
 A female Scottish royal consort, a female spouse of a Scottish monarch

Other uses
 Jennie Quigley (1850–1936), whose stagename was "Queen of Scotland" and "Scottish Queen"
 The Queen of Scotland, a folksong
 , a 19th century paddle steamer ocean-going steamship
 , a ship sunk in WWI; see List of shipwrecks in May 1915
 Scottish Queen (horse), the 1868 winner of the 1000 Guineas Stakes

See also

 Monarchy of Scotland
 
 
 
 Mary, Queen of Scots (disambiguation)
 Queen of England (disambiguation)